Events in 2017 in Japanese television. At the time to the commemoration of the 100th anniversary of anime, it was known as the Year of the Anime Centennial Anniversary.

Events
 June 30 ArtLand ceases operations after suffering financial difficulties. Seven Mortal Sins was being broadcast in Japan at the time of the studio's closure, and concluded on July 29; consequently, Seven Mortal Sins was the last anime to be produced by ArtLand.
 October 1 TV Asahi moves the Super Hero Time block from 7:30-8:30 JST to 9:00-10:00 JST to make room for a Sunday morning news program entitled Sunday LIVE!!. The ordering of the shows in the block is also changed, with the Kamen Rider series airing before the Super Sentai series.

Ongoing

New Shows & Returning Series

Ending

Sports Events

Special Events & Milestone Episodes in 2017

Deaths

See also
 2017 in anime
 2017 in Japan
 2017 in Japanese music
 List of Japanese films of 2017

References